The 2013 Nippon Professional Baseball season is the 64th season since the NPB was reorganized in 1950.

Juiced ball scandal 
At the beginning of the 2013 NPB season, a new livelier ball was introduced in secret. This juiced up baseball allowed more home runs to be scored, leading to Tokyo Yakult Swallows outfielder Wladimir Balentien to break the 55 single season home run record set by Sadaharu Oh and later tied by Tuffy Rhodes and Alex Cabrera. This caused three-term NPB commissioner Ryozo Kato resigning, though he claimed that he did not know about these juiced baseballs.

Regular season standings

Climax Series

Note: All of the games that are played in the first two rounds of the Climax Series are held at the higher seed's home stadium. The team with the higher regular-season standing also advances if the round ends in a tie.

First stage
The regular season league champions, the Tohoku Rakuten Golden Eagles (PL) and the Yomiuri Giants (CL), received byes to the championship round.

Central League

Pacific League

Final stage
The regular season league champions, the Tohoku Rakuten Golden Eagles (PL) and the Yomiuri Giants (CL), received a one-game advantage.

Central League

Pacific League

* Postponed from October 20 due to rain

Japan Series

League leaders

Central League

Pacific League

2013 average attendance

See also
2013 Korea Professional Baseball season
2013 Major League Baseball season

References